Running from Crazy is a 2013 television documentary film by director Barbara Kopple about the family of Mariel Hemingway, granddaughter of Nobel Prize-winning author Ernest Hemingway. Through the eyes of Mariel, who received an Oscar nomination for her role in Woody Allen's 1979 film Manhattan, and who has spoken for the American Foundation for Suicide Prevention, it chronicles the story of three of the author's grandchildren; Mariel, Margaux Hemingway and Joan "Muffet" Hemingway, daughters of Jack Hemingway, and their struggles with the family history of substance abuse, mental illness and suicide. First shown at the 2013 Sundance Film Festival, the documentary was promoted on the Oprah Winfrey Network, which aired its premiere on April 27, 2014.

Synopsis
Mariel comments early in the film on the fact that seven family members have committed suicide, including Ernest and  Margaux. Ernest shot himself a few months before his granddaughter Mariel was born.

The film includes excerpts from lengthy footage filmed by Margaux in 1983, called by a reviewer the "most riveting depictions of the Hemingway clan".  It demonstrates the contrast between the two sisters: Margaux's modeling and acting career ultimately collapsed, and in 1996 she died of a drug overdose just days before the 35th anniversary of her grandfather's suicide, while Mariel's early career was successful. In the documentary, Mariel describes her own experience with depression and thoughts of suicide, which she says she has overcome, and talks of her difficulties in dealing with sometimes abusive family members, and with the mental illness of her sister Muffet, diagnosed with "bipolar schizophrenia".

Reception
A reviewer called the film "one of the bleakest snapshots of the human soul at this year's [Sundance] festival".

References

Notes

External links

2013 documentary films
2013 films
American documentary films
Documentary films about families
Documentary films about mental disorders
Documentary films about suicide
Films directed by Barbara Kopple
Hemingway family
2010s English-language films
2010s American films